Rosey E. Pool (born Rosa Eva Pool; 7 May 1905 – 29 September 1971) was a Dutch poet and anthologist of African-American poetry.

Biography

Early years
Rosey Pool was born and raised in a secular Jewish family in Amsterdam. In the 1920s she participated in Dutch Popular Front youth movements, such as the socialist Arbeiders Jeugd Centrale (AJC) and the Social Democratic Students Club (SDSC). In 1927 she was one of the founders of the Socialistische Kunstenaarskring (SKK, or Socialist Artists Circle).

1930s: PhD and activism in Berlin 

In August 1927, shortly after her engagement to the Berlin jurist and later Hamburg senator Gerhard Kramer (1904–1973), Pool moved to Berlin. There she studied English literature at the Friedrich-Wilhelms-Universität (currently known as the Humboldt University). Although she later claimed to be an anthropologist, she majored in philology. She wrote her dissertation on The Poetry of the American Negro, but was unable to finish this because of anti-Jewish measures by the Nazis. In 1935 Kramer and Pool divorced. From Berlin, Pool helped German Jews to flee to the Netherlands, by providing them addresses. In January 1939, shortly after the Kristallnacht, Pool returned to Amsterdam.

1940s: resistance during World War II 

During the Second World War she taught at the Jewish Lyceum in Amsterdam (with Anne Frank among her pupils). Pool became involved in a German Jewish resistance group named Van Dien, which had formed around the Tehuis Oosteinde. In September 1943, this resistance group helped her to escape from the Nazi transit camp Westerbork. She hid in the town of Baarn, wrote resistance poetry and compiled a bundle of African-American poetry.

By the end of 1949, Pool had moved to London to live with her friend "Isa" Isenberg.

1950s and 1960s: expert in African-American poetry 

After the war, Pool established correspondence with such well-known African-American writers and poets as Countee Cullen, Langston Hughes, W. E. B. Du Bois, Naomi Madgett, Owen Dodson, Gordon Heath, and Robert Hayden. From her London home she became involved in the Black Arts Movement, both in Britain and the United States.

Pool traveled to the United States as a Fulbright scholar and with UNCF funding (1959–1960), and was a guest lecturer at a number of colleges in the Deep South. In the United States she contributed to the emancipation of African Americans in the Civil Rights Movement by comparing anti-Jewish measures of the Nazis with the segregation of the American South. When Pool was a guest lecturer at Alabama A and M where she organized two writers' conferences, with Samuel W. Allen (Paul Vesey), Margaret Burroughs, Dudley Randall and Mari Evans. Ed Simpkins explained: "it was Rosey Pool's [book] Beyond the Blues that first brought us together (...)." An LP also entitled Beyond the Blues was produced in London by Argo in 1963, with featured readers including Brock Peters, Gordon Heath, Vinette Carroll, and Cleo Laine.

In 1966 Pool was a jury member at the World Festival of Black Arts, held in Dakar, Senegal. The jury awarded prizes to the poet Robert Hayden and Nelson Mandela. On 30 April 30, 1965, Pool became a follower of the Baháʼí Faith. She was visible promoting the religion.

Selected bibliography

Translator
 Emily Dickinson, “Ten poems” (Amsterdam: Vijf Ponden Pers, 1944)
 William Shakespeare, Three sonnets (Utrecht: G.M. van Wees, 1944)
 Annie M. G. Schmidt, Love from Mick and Mandy (London: Odhams Press, 1961)
 Annie M. G. Schmidt, Good luck Mick and Mandy (London: Odhams Press, 1961)
 Annie M. G. Schmidt, Take care, Mick and Mandy (London: Odhams Press, 1961)
 Claude Brown, Mijn Harlem (Rotterdam: Lemniscaat, 1966)

Author
 "African Renaissance", in: Phylon [1940–1956], vol. 14, no. 1 (1st Qtr, 1953), pp. 5–8
 "The Negro Actor in Europe", in: Phylon [1940–1956], vol. 14, no. 3 (3rd Qtr, 1953), pp. 258–267
 'n Engelse sleutel. Een ABC over het "Perfide Albion" (Amsterdam: De Boer, 1957)
 (Co-editor with Eric Walrond), Black and Unknown Bards: A Collection of Negro Poetry (Aldington, Kent: Hand & Flower Press, 1958)
 (Co-editor with Paul Breman), Ik zag hoe zwart ik was. Poëzie van Noordamerikaanse negers. Een tweetalige bloemlezing van Rosey E. Pool en Paul Breman (Den Haag: Bert Bakker / Daamen N.V., 1958)
 (Co-editor with Paul Breman), Black all day. American negro poetry (Amsterdam: Instituut voor Kunstnijverheidsonderwijs, 1960) 
 (Editor) Beyond the Blues: New Poems by American Negroes (Lympne, Kent, England: Hand and Flower Press, 1962)
 "The Discovery of American Negro Poetry", in: Freedomways. A quarterly review of the Negro Freedom Movement, Fall 1963, vol. 3, no. 4.
 (Editor) Ik ben de nieuwe neger (Den Haag: Bert Bakker, 1965)
 "Fling me your challenge. Commentary On The Literary Scene", in: Negro Digest, December 1965, vol. XV, no. 2, pp. 54–60
 "Robert Hayden: Poet Laureate", in: Negro Digest, June 1966, vol. XV, no. 8, pp. 39–75.
 Lachen om niet te huilen (Rotterdam: Lemniscaat, 1968)
 "Anne Frank: The Child and the Legend", in: World Order: Spring 1972, Vol. 6, No. 3 
 "'Grand Prix de la Poezie' for Robert Hayden", in: World Order: Summer 1983, Vol. 17, No. 4

Secondary literature
 Anneke Buys, The marvellous gift of friendship (unpublished manuscript, Apeldoorn, 1987)
 Lonneke Geerlings, "A Visual Analysis of Rosey E. Pool's Correspondence Archives. Biographical Data, Intersectionality, and Social Network Analysis", Proceedings of the First Conference on Biographical Data in a Digital World 2015, Amsterdam, The Netherlands, 9 April 2015, pp. 61–67. 
Lonneke Geerlings, Survivor, Agitator: Rosey E. Pool and the Transatlantic Century. PhD thesis, Vrije Universiteit Amsterdam, 2020. To be published with the University of Georgia Press in 2021.

References

External links 
 PhD project "TRAVELLING TRANSLATOR. ROSEY POOL (1905-1971) A DUTCH CULTURAL MOBILISER IN THE ‘TRANSATLANTIC CENTURY’" (2015-2020), CLUE+, Vrije Universiteit Amsterdam.
 "Rosey Pool Collection", Library – Special Collections, University of Sussex.
 Jo Baines, "Black and Unknown Bards: The Rosey Pool Library in the Legacy Collection", Creating the Library Legacy Collection, University of Sussex, 29 April 2016.

1905 births
1971 deaths
20th-century Bahá'ís
Dutch women writers
20th-century Dutch poets
Dutch translators
Humboldt University of Berlin alumni
Writers from Amsterdam
20th-century women writers
20th-century translators
20th-century Dutch women